Mike Masaru Masaoka (October 15, 1915 – June 26, 1991) was a Japanese-American lobbyist, author, and spokesman. He worked with the Japanese American Citizens League for over 30 years. He was a key player in encouraging cooperation of the JACL with Japanese American internment during World War II, but also fought for rights of Japanese-Americans during and after the war.

Early life
Masaoka was born in Fresno, California. The family moved to Salt Lake City where Masaoka legally changed his first name to "Mike" and became a member of the Church of Jesus Christ of Latter-day Saints.

He became a champion debater and graduated in 1937 from the University of Utah in economics and political science.

Japanese American Citizens League
At the age of 25, Masaoka was named National Secretary and Field Executive of the Japanese American Citizens League (JACL) which was strictly a mainland organization with no connection to Hawaii just before the outbreak of World War II. During Fair Employment Practice Committee (FEPC) hearings held in October 1941, Masaoka testified on employment discrimination faced by Japanese Americans in the defense industry, leading to pledges from various organizations to eliminate anti-Japanese bias.

Masaoka was a key player in JACL's decision to cooperate with the Japanese American internment during the war, seeing that resistance would be counterproductive and increase the tension between the Nisei and the FDR Administration.  In his position as a national spokesman, he urged cooperation and opposed legal challenges to the government and advised the government on how to run the camps (thus to reduce friction between the internees and their captors).  He also advocated the segregation of so‑called "troublemakers," though the War Relocation Authority cast the net more broadly than Masaoka had anticipated.  The government used him as their liaison with the entire Japanese American population in the camps, although he himself was never imprisoned in a camp. As a result of his stance, Masaoka was widely denounced within the Japanese American community as a sellout and collaborator. 

Masaoka was involved in leading the call for the formation of a military unit from the mainland; however, different dynamics occurred in Hawaii which provided all of the men in the 100th Battalion in June 1942 and 2,686 men out of the 10,000 who answered the call in the 442nd Regimental Combat Team to join the 1,500 from the mainland. He later served as publicist for the highly decorated volunteer units, so that the contributions (and heavy price paid) of the Japanese Americans would be known nationwide.

After World War II, Masaoka argued for reparations to Japanese Americans for wartime losses, naturalization and immigration privileges, and for halting deportations to Japan. His lobbying on behalf of the JACL helped pave the way for passage of the Japanese-American Claims Act of 1948.

Near the end of his life, Masaoka strongly implied (without directly stating) that the government had pressured him to make statements and "suggestions" to go along with their policies.  In a PBS interview, he said "it was a kind of a shibai . . .We were pretty desperate."   Shibai (芝居) is Japanese for performance or show.

Later career
Masaoka served as technical consultant for the 1951 film Go For Broke! which not only portrayed the heroics of the 442nd RCT and 100th Battalion, but also starred several veterans of the 442nd.

In 1950, Masaoka was involved in successfully lobbying for the rights of the Issei (Japanese immigrants) to naturalize as citizens.  In 1952 he worked with the ACLU to bring a case in his mother's name, Masaoka vs. the State of California, to the California State Supreme Court that was one of the two cases that overturned the Alien Land Law (Masaoka v. People, 39 Cal.2d 883). 

In 1950, Masaoka represented the JACL as a founding member of the Leadership Council on Civil Rights, and joined Dr. Martin Luther King's 1963 March on Washington. 

In 1968, Masaoka received Japan's Order of the Rising Sun award.

With his own consulting firm, Mike Masaoka Associates, Masaoka lobbied on behalf of American and Japanese commercial interests. In 1972 he left JACL to become a full‑time lobbyist. His autobiography, They Call Me Moses Masaoka, written with Bill Hosokawa, was published in 1987. Associates considered the title a sign of his ego, though the title was originally bestowed derisively by political opponents during the 1940s.   Masaoka noted with ironic humor that, unlike Moses, he led his people on a journey from the promised land of California to desert internment camps.

Personal life and death
Masaoka was married to Etsu Mineta Masaoka, the elder sister of Secretary of Transportation and Congressman Norman Mineta. Masaoka died in Washington, DC in 1991.

References

External links
 Densho Encyclopedia article by Shiho Imai

1915 births
1991 deaths
Latter Day Saints from Utah
American military personnel of Japanese descent
Japanese-American civil rights activists
Internment of Japanese Americans
University of Utah alumni
People from Fresno, California
Activists from California
Converts to Mormonism
Recipients of the Order of the Rising Sun, 3rd class